Thomas Kay (November 1892 – 1940) was an English footballer who played in the Football League for Stoke.

Career
Kay was born in Mossley and played amateur football with Walkden before joining Bolton Wanderers but due to the outbreak of World War I was never able to make an appearance for Bolton. After the war he joined Stoke and was an ever-present in 1919–20 making 43 appearances he continued to be 1st choice in 1920–21 making 70 constitutive appearances. He was dropped by manager Arthur Shallcross after he conceded five goals against Bristol City and only played in six matches in 1921–22 before being released at the end of the season.

Career statistics

References

English footballers
Bolton Wanderers F.C. players
Stoke City F.C. players
English Football League players
1892 births
People from Mossley
1940 deaths
Association football goalkeepers